The Salisbury Plain River is a  river in Plymouth County, Massachusetts that flows from the city of Brockton into the towns of West Bridgewater and East Bridgewater where it joins the Matfield River, a major tributary of the Taunton River.

The Salisbury Plain River flows through the heart of Brockton, Massachusetts, once a major shoe manufacturing center. The river is formed by several smaller streams, including Trout Brook, Cary Brook, and Salisbury Brook.

See also
Taunton River Watershed

References

Rivers of Plymouth County, Massachusetts
Taunton River watershed
Brockton, Massachusetts
Rivers of Massachusetts